Leviathan's Deep is a novel by Jayge Carr published in 1979.

Plot summary
Leviathan's Deep is a novel in which humanoid aliens from a matriarchal society resist cultural assimilation by the generally patriarchal Terrans.

Reception
Kirkus Reviews states "Thematically erratic [...] but when it's good, it's very good."

Greg Costikyan reviewed Leviathan's Deep in Ares Magazine #6 and commented that "The result is a gripping and powerful novel, portending good things to come from a remarkable novelist."

The novel was also reviewed by Paul Kincaid in Vector 98.

References

1979 American novels
1979 science fiction novels
American science fiction novels
Doubleday (publisher) books